Sara Errani and Roberta Vinci were the defending champions but decided not to participate.

Lourdes Domínguez Lino and Arantxa Parra Santonja won the title, defeating Catalina Castaño and Mariana Duque Mariño in the final, 6–4, 7–6(7–1).

Seeds

Draw

Draw

References
 Main Draw

2013 Abierto Mexicano Telcel